Jorge Nelson Ramírez (born 22 October 1955) is a Peruvian footballer. He played in 12 matches for the Peru national football team from 1983 to 1985. He was also part of Peru's squad for the 1983 Copa América tournament.

References

1955 births
Living people
Peruvian footballers
Peru international footballers
Association football defenders
People from Madre de Dios Region